= Kestrel High School =

Public charter high school in Prescott, Arizona

Coordinates: 34°32′47″N 112°27′36″W

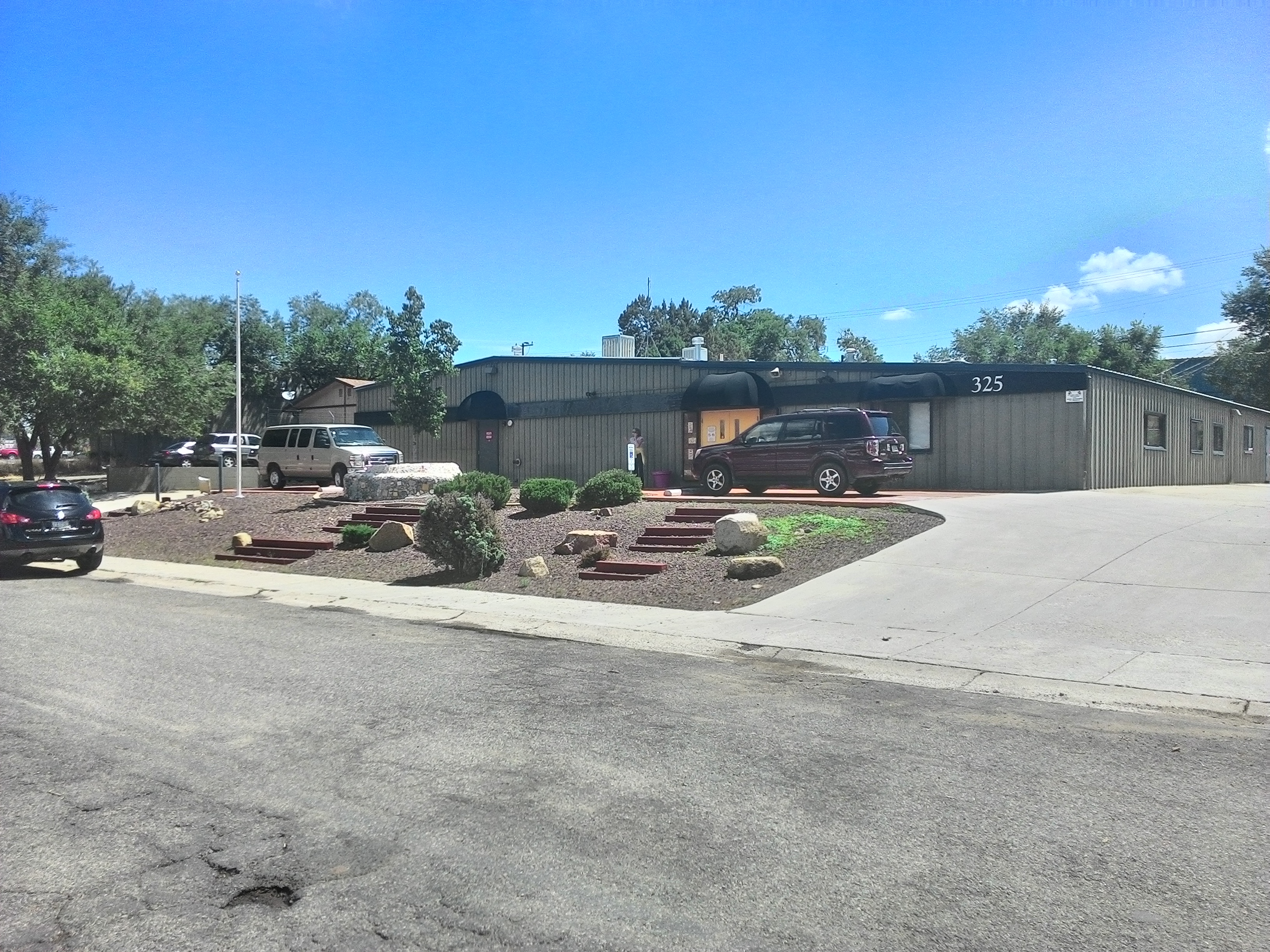

Location
- 325 N. Washington St. Prescott, Arizona 86301; United States

Information
- School type: Public charter high school
- Principal: Jennifer Womack
- Grades: 9–12
- Enrollment: 37 students (Jan. 2014)

Kestrel High School was a small public charter high school in Prescott, Arizona. It was operated by Kestrel Schools, Inc. It opened in 2000, and its first graduating class was in 2001. It was accredited for the first time in 2000.

In the 2014–2015 school year, it changed its name to Prescott Preparatory Academy and announced new programs and a new focus "on helping kids to graduate." These programs included extra tutoring, life skills education, and after school programs. Currently the school is permanently closed.
